Sylvester Patton is a former member of the Ohio House of Representatives, succeeded by Bob Hagan.

Biography

Early life and education

Career

Marriage and children
Married to the former Juanell C. Spooney, they have two children; Rev. Dr. Sylvester Delaney Patton, III (M.A, M.Div, D.Min) and Marcus Patton (MBA, candidate for Ph.D in Sport Marketing)

References

External links
African-American Legislators: Sylvester Patton

Year of birth missing (living people)
Living people
Democratic Party members of the Ohio House of Representatives
Politicians from Youngstown, Ohio
Youngstown State University alumni
21st-century American politicians